Key Biscayne is an island town in Miami-Dade County, Florida, United States. The population was 14,809 at the 2020 census, up from 12,344 in 2010.

Geography
Key Biscayne lies south of Miami Beach and east of Miami. The village is connected to Miami via the Rickenbacker Causeway, originally built in 1947. Because of its low elevation and direct exposure to the Atlantic Ocean, it is usually among the first Miami areas to be evacuated before an oncoming hurricane.

The village is bordered on the north by Crandon Park, a Miami-Dade County park; on the south by Bill Baggs Cape Florida State Park; on the east by the Atlantic Ocean; and on the west by Biscayne Bay.

History

While there had been earlier schemes to develop a town on Key Biscayne, it wasn't until the opening of the  Rickenbacker Causeway from Miami to Virginia Key and on to Key Biscayne in 1947 that the island was opened up to large-scale residential development. The northern two-thirds of the island had been operated as the largest coconut plantation in the continental United States during the first half of the 20th century. The remaining Matheson property, stretching across the middle of the island, was then sold off to developers. Starting in 1951, the Mackle Construction Company offered new homes on the island for US$9,540, with just US$500 down. A U.S. Post Office contract branch was opened, the Community Church started holding services in an old coconut-husking shed, and the Key Biscayne Elementary School opened in 1952.

The southern third of Key Biscayne, which included Cape Florida, was owned by James Deering and, after his death, by his brother Charles, for 35 years. In 1948 José Manuel Áleman, a Cuban politician in exile, bought the Cape Florida property from the Deering estate. After Áleman died in 1951, his widow, Elena Santeiro Garcia, added to her Cape Florida property by buying an ocean-to-bay strip that had been part of the Matheson property. This strip included a canal that had been dug by William Matheson in the 1920s, and which extended from the bay across most of the island. The land north of this canal was developed as part of what is now the Village of Key Biscayne. Garcia sold the Cape Florida property in 1966 to the state of Florida. This land became Bill Baggs Cape Florida State Park, which opened January 1, 1967.

U.S. President Richard Nixon purchased the first of his three waterfront homes, forming a compound known as the Florida White House, in 1969 to be close to his close friend and confidant Bebe Rebozo and industrialist Robert Abplanalp (inventor of the modern spray can valve). Bebe Rebozo, owner of the Key Biscayne Bank, was indicted for laundering a $100,000 donation from Howard Hughes to the Nixon election campaign. President Kennedy and Nixon met for the first time after the 1960 election loss by Nixon in an oceanfront villa at the old Key Biscayne Hotel. Plans for the Watergate break-in at Democratic headquarters were discussed at the Key Biscayne Nixon compound and, as the Watergate scandal unfolded, Nixon spent more time in seclusion there. Nixon visited Key Biscayne more than 50 times between 1969 and 1973. The U.S. Department of Defense spent $400,000 constructing a helicopter landing pad in Biscayne Bay adjacent to the Nixon compound, and when Nixon sold his property, including the helicopter pad, there were public accusations that he enriched himself at taxpayer expense.

The area was incorporated as a new municipality in 1991, which made it the first new city in Miami-Dade County in over fifty years.  Rafael Conte was elected the first mayor along with members of the founding Village Council including Clifford Brody, Mortimer Fried, Michael Hill, Luis Lauredo, Joe Rasco, and Raymond Sullivan.  The municipality's first manager was C. Samuel Kissinger and the first clerk was Guido Inguanzo.  The incorporation of the village provided local control over taxes and future development.

In 1992, Hurricane Andrew flooded some homes and businesses on Key Biscayne, impacting insurance. The eye wall passed over uninhabited Bill Baggs Cape Florida State Park which received the brunt of the storm. The storm damage was a blessing for the park because it destroyed all the non-native vegetation that the state had been trying to eradicate.  Federal and state funding allowed the replanting with native vegetation, making the park a showplace natural area. The town is in Evacuation Zone A. A 2017 study found that the town could be partly flooded at high tides by 2045 after sea-level rise. Property values fell. In November 2020, the town voted to approve a $100 million bond to protect itself.

In recent years, the construction of several large resort hotels, condominium complexes and shopping centers on the island has affected the once bucolic island life, as commercialism has continued to accelerate at a frenetic pace.  The village has its own fire, police and public elementary and middle school. The millage tax rate remains one of the lowest of any municipality in Miami-Dade County. In 2004, the village completed the construction of a civic center including fire, police and administration buildings and a recreation and community center with indoor multi use courts, outdoor swimming pool and a renowned musical theater program.

Climate
Key Biscayne has a tropical monsoon climate (Am). Key Biscayne experiences hot, humid summers and warm, dry winters.  The island is in USDA plant zone 11a. Due to its island location, Key Biscayne is subject to cooler highs than Miami year-round.  Hurricanes threaten the island occasionally, though landfalls are rare. Precipitation is lower than that of Miami, as the Atlantic Ocean inhibits summer thunderstorm convection.

Demographics

2020 census

As of the 2020 U.S. census, there were 14,809 people, 4,422 households, and 3,263 families residing in the village.

2010 census

, there were 7,072 households, out of which 33.5% were vacant. In 2000, 32.3% had children under the age of 18 living with them, 58.0% were married couples living together, 7.7% had a female householder with no husband present, and 31.9% were non-families. 27.9% of all households were made up of individuals, and 9.5% had someone living alone who was 65 years of age or older.  The average household size was 2.47 and the average family size was 2.99.

2000 census
In 2000, the village population was spread out, with 24.2% under the age of 18, 4.6% from 18 to 24, 29.6% from 25 to 44, 26.0% from 45 to 64, and 15.6% who were 65 years of age or older. The median age was 40 years. For every 100 females, there were 88.4 males. For every 100 females age 18 and over, there were 84.8 males.

In 2000, the median income for a household in the village was $86,599, and the median income for a family was $107,610. Males had a median income of $86,322 versus $46,765 for females. The per capita income for the village was $54,213.

, speakers of Spanish as a first language accounted 59.73% of residents, while English made up 30.84%, Portuguese was at 2.83%, French at 2.67%, Italian consisted of 1.67%, and German was the mother tongue of 1.47% of the population.

Key Biscayne is a small, intimate community. The majority of families that live there have known each other for generations. The children who grew up on the island are known as "Key Rats".

Hotels and condominiums controversy
As noted above, the construction of several condominium complexes in Key Biscayne caused the population to soar. In 2007, voters approved an amendment to the village charter requiring that future land use changes be approved by voters. In 2008, the village council, saying that requiring community voting on zoning changes infringed on its responsibility, submitted another proposal to revise the charter. But on November 4, 2008, voters overwhelmingly rejected the council's proposed change, defeating the amendment by a more than two-to-one margin.

The controversy over density in the village is related to the fate of the Sonesta hotel property on the eastern side of the island.

There are several large condominium and hotel complexes on Key Biscayne, including
 The Ritz-Carlton Hotel
 The Grand Bay
 The Ocean Club
 The Key Colony complex of four buildings, Botanica, EmeraldBay, Oceansound, and Tidemark. The Botanica building has some units that allow short-term rentals
 The Towers of Key Biscayne
 Casa del Mar is the tallest building—27 floors
 Oceana is the newest building, constructed in the land of old Sonesta Hotel

Media
The Islander News is a weekly community newspaper serving Key Biscayne. The estimated circulation in 2020 was 3,600.

Key Biscayne Magazine is a lifestyle magazine published in Miami by TAG Media, publishers of Brickell Magazine. The circulation of the magazine was about 10,000 in 2020.

Education

Miami-Dade County Public Schools serves Key Biscayne. The Key Biscayne K–8 Center serves Key Biscayne.  Middle school students may attend Ponce de Leon Middle School in Coral Gables instead of the Key Biscayne School. High school students are zoned to Coral Gables Senior High School.

MAST Academy, a magnet school on Virginia Key, has since 2012 given eligible Key Biscayne residents priority in filling 1,100 seats in the school's Cambridge program.

The Miami-Dade Public Library System operates the  Key Biscayne Branch Library. It opened in January 1985.

St. Agnes Academy is a Catholic private school on the island located at 122 Harbor Drive, of the Roman Catholic Archdiocese of Miami. It serves pre-K–8th grade.

Notable people
 Jaime Bayly, writer
 Jay Berger (born 1966), tennis player; highest world ranking # 7
 Raul Boesel, race car driver
 Cher, actress and singer
 Soman Chainani, writer
 Gaetano Ciancio, transplant surgeon
 Isabel Pérez Farfante, carcinologist
 Mary Joe Fernandez, tennis star
 Timothy Ferris, author, went to Key Biscayne Elementary School
 Emerson Fittipaldi, ex-F1 and Indianapolis 500 winner, Indycar driver
 Fonseca, Colombian singer
 Andy Garcia, actor
 Arthur Hanlon, pianist
 Juanes, Colombian singer
 Luis Lauredo, village councilman and former U.S. Ambassador to the Organization of American States
 Martin Margulies, billionaire art collector and fixture of Miami's high society
 Juan Pablo Montoya, Colombian race car driver
 Richard Nixon, U.S. president; see Nixon's Florida White House
 Brad Pitt, actor; once owned a home in Key Biscayne
 "Bebe" Rebozo, banker and confidante of Richard Nixon
 Eddie Rickenbacker, fighter pilot, and his wife Adelaide

Other information
Key Biscayne hosts the Tennis Center at Crandon Park, former home to the Miami Open Tennis Tournament, and a golf course, along with many amenities for water sports and fishing.

Key Biscayne has a visitors center, open 24/7, 365 days a year, located in the Village Hall, 88 West McIntyre Street #100, adjacent to the Police Station. Staffed M–F from 9am to 5pm

Gallery

References

Further reading

External links

 
History of Miami-Dade County, Florida
Villages in Miami-Dade County, Florida
Populated places established in 1947
1947 establishments in Florida
Villages in Florida
Populated coastal places in Florida on the Atlantic Ocean
Former census-designated places in Florida
Seaside resorts in Florida